Bika may refer to
Bika (surname)
Bika, Iran, a village in Iran
Bika, Nawanshahr, a village in India
Bika Ambon, a dessert from Indonesia

See also
Bikas (disambiguation)